Kazuhito (written: 一仁, 和仁, 和人 or 数人) is a masculine Japanese given name. Notable people with the name include:

, Japanese footballer
, Japanese composer
, Japanese comedian
, Japanese footballer and manager
, Japanese baseball player
, Japanese gymnast
, Japanese footballer
, Japanese classical guitarist

Fictional characters 

 Kazuhito Narita (成田 一仁), a character from the manga and anime Haikyu!! with the position of middle blocker from Karasuno High

Japanese masculine given names